Christopher Eric Edward Higham (born 1930) is a former athlete who competed for England.

Athletics career
He represented England and won a silver medal in the 120 yards hurdles at the 1954 British Empire and Commonwealth Games in Vancouver, Canada.

References

1930 births
Possibly living people
English male hurdlers
Athletes (track and field) at the 1954 British Empire and Commonwealth Games
Commonwealth Games medallists in athletics
Commonwealth Games silver medallists for England
Medallists at the 1954 British Empire and Commonwealth Games